The Artsakh dram is a monetary unit of the de facto independent Republic of Artsakh. Although it is legal tender, it is not as widely used as the Armenian dram.

Coins

Two commemorative coins were issued in 2003, while seven different coins have also been issued, all dated 2004. They are two aluminum 50 luma coins featuring a horse and a leaping antelope, three aluminum 1 dram coins featuring a wildcat, a pheasant and St. Gregory the Illuminator, two aluminum-bronze 5 dram coins featuring the Ghazanchetsots Cathedral in the town of Shushi and the We Are Our Mountains monument right outside Stepanakert, and two aluminum 1000 dram coins featuring Lake Van and Kevork Chavush. A new series of coins was issued in 2013, and consists of two 50 luma coins featuring a horse and antelope, three 1 dram coins depicting a leopard, wolf and pheasant and two five dram coins showing a bear and a capricorn.

Banknotes
2 and 10 dram banknotes have been issued, bearing the date 2004 and printed by Österreichische Staatsdruckerei (Austria State Printing House).

See also
Armenian dram
Artsakhbank
Economy of the Republic of Artsakh
List of currencies
List of circulating currencies
List of currencies in Europe

References

Currencies of Europe
Currencies of Asia
Economy of Armenia
Local currencies
Fixed exchange rate
Currencies introduced in 2004